Andrés Spokoiny (born 1968) is an Argentine Jewish activist, now living in New York City and is the President and CEO of the Jewish Funders Network.

Personal life 
Spokoiny was born at Buenos Aires in 1968. Both his paternal and maternal grandparents emigrated from Poland in the 1930s.

He and his younger brother were raised by their divorced mother, who still lives in Buenos Aires. His childhood coincided with tough economic times, and the local Jewish community center was a refuge for his family. He grew up in a strong Jewish home and, with assistance from the local community, attended Jewish schools. "I knew the names of the streets of Haifa before I knew those of Buenos Aires."

At his bar mitzvah, he discovered that being Jewish involved a religion, as well as a culture, and entered a Conservative seminary of Masorti movement. His formation is well-rounded and includes seven years at a rabbinical seminary, though he was never ordained Rabbi. He received an MBA degree equivalent for Jewish education studies at the Hebrew University of Jerusalem and studied Business Administration from the University of Buenos Aires.

Spokoiny is fluent in English, French, Spanish, Portuguese, Hebrew and Yiddish.

Career
He worked in the private sector working for IBM in South America. He thought he would make his career in the corporate world until he received a phone call from the American Jewish Joint Distribution Committee (JDC) in 1997 to come and work in Paris, France. (They had first known him when he ran High Holiday services for the Jewish community of Cuba as a rabbinical student.)

While working at the JDC, a Jewish American NGO known for supporting Jewish communities around the world, in Paris, Spokoiny served as the JDC's Regional Director. He was on the frontline of the rebuilding of the Jewish communities in Poland, the Baltic states and parts of Russia after the fall of communism and also involved in other projects to develop communities internationally for Northeast Europe.

Spokoiny has, concurrently, been Director of Leatid Europe, the leading training institute for Jewish lay and professional leaders in Europe. It was rewarding but not fun work for him. Rebuilding Jewish communities that had basically been wiped out by Nazism and communism was like taking revenge on history. It was fascinating, but daunting and emotionally heavy.

Spokoiny was the executive director of the Jewish Federation CJA in Montreal from 2009 to 2011. In 2011, Spokoiny joined the Jewish Funders Network as president and CEO.

He was a Board Member of the JDC International Centre for Community Development (June 2012).

Spokoiny also serves as a member of the Selection Committee of the Genesis Prize Foundation.

References

External links
 Jewish Funders Network Website

1968 births
Living people
Argentine people of Polish-Jewish descent
Argentine Ashkenazi Jews
Jewish activists
People from Buenos Aires
Yiddish-speaking people